Qualiano is a comune (municipality) in the Metropolitan City of Naples in the Italian region Campania, located about  northwest of Naples.

Qualiano borders the following municipalities: Calvizzano, Giugliano in Campania, Villaricca.

References

Cities and towns in Campania